Li Yixuan (born 19 April 1997) is a professional Chinese tennis player.

On 7 August 2017, she reached her highest WTA singles ranking of world No. 670. On 9 May 2016, she peaked at No. 574 in the doubles rankings. Li has won one singles title on the ITF Women's Circuit.

She made her WTA main-draw debut at the 2016 Shenzhen Open, partnering Sheng Yuqi in the doubles draw.

ITF finals

Singles (1–1)

External links
 
 

1997 births
Living people
Chinese female tennis players
21st-century Chinese women